

Bosa (died  705) was an Anglo-Saxon Bishop of York during the 7th and early 8th centuries. He was educated at Whitby Abbey, where he became a monk. Following Wilfrid's removal from York in 678 the diocese was divided into three, leaving a greatly reduced see of York, to which Bosa was appointed bishop. He was himself removed in 687 and replaced by Wilfrid, but in 691 Wilfrid was once more ejected and Bosa returned to the see. He died in about 705, and subsequently appears as a saint in an 8th-century liturgical calendar.

Life

Bosa was a Northumbrian, educated at Whitby Abbey under the abbess Hilda. He subsequently joined the monastery as a monk, and became one of five men educated at Whitby who went on to become bishops.

In 678, after Wilfrid was removed from the bishopric of York and banished from Northumbria, the diocese of York was divided into three. Bosa was appointed to the now greatly reduced diocese of York, which included the sub-kingdom of Deira, thanks to the support of King Ecgfrith of Northumbria and Theodore of Tarsus, the Archbishop of Canterbury. Bosa was consecrated in his cathedral at York in 678 by Theodore, but Wilfrid declared that he was unable to work with Bosa because he did not consider him to be a member of the Catholic Church. Bosa's episcopate lasted nine years, but with Wilfrid back in favour, in 687 Bosa was removed just as his predecessor had been. He returned to York in 691, after Wilfrid was once again expelled. While bishop, Bosa introduced a communal life for the clergy of the cathedral, and set up a continuous liturgy in the cathedral.

Death and legacy

The date of Bosa's death is unknown; he was still alive in 704 but must have died before 706, when his successor was named. His successor at York was John of Beverley, the Bishop of Hexham. A contemporary writer, Bede, praised Bosa as a man of "singular merit and sanctity". Bede also praised Bosa's humility. Bosa was also responsible for the early education of Acca, later Bishop of Hexham, who grew up in his household.

Bosa appears as a saint in an 8th-century liturgical calendar from York, the only sign that he was venerated as a saint before the Norman Conquest of England. The 16th-century English antiquary John Leland included Bosa in his list of saint's resting places in England, giving it as York. Bosa's feast day is 9 March.

Notes

Citations

References

External links
 

7th-century English bishops
Northumbrian saints
Bishops of York
People from Whitby
8th-century Christian saints
Yorkshire saints
7th-century Christian saints
Burials at York Minster